The Kot Diji Fort (Fort of the Daughter), formally known as Fort Ahmadabad, is an 18th-century Talpur-era fort located in the town of Kot Diji in Khairpur District, Pakistan, about 25 miles east of the Indus River at the edge of the Thar Desert. The fort sits above a pre-Harappan Civilization archaeological site dating to 2500 to 2800 B.C.E.

Background
The Kot Diji Fort was built by Mir Sohrab Khan Talpur, between 1785 and 1795. The site sits on a hill at the southern end of the Rohri Hills, and sits above a prehistoric mound of the same name, where remains of a pre-Harappan civilization have been found.

Structure

The fort sits atop a 110 foot tall high hill that rises above the city of Kot Diji. The fort's 30 foot tall walls encircle the uppermost portion of the fort, resulting a narrow-width fortress with perimeter of 1.8 kilometres. The fort contains three strategically placed towers that are each 50 feet tall. The fort contains several sites for cannon placement, and contains numerous inner passages for protection. The fort also contains a water reservoir, munition storage, prison, courtroom, numerous cells for security personnel, and a small regal residence.

Conservation
Government of Pakistan has declared it a protected heritage site in Pakistan, though it has been noted that portions of the fort are under control of powerful local families.

Gallery

See also
List of UNESCO World Heritage Sites in Pakistan
List of forts in Pakistan
List of museums in Pakistan

References

External links

Kot Diji (Interior Architecture )
Kot Diji

Forts in Sindh
Tourist attractions in Sindh
Buildings and structures in Khairpur District
Talpur dynasty